Paraseiulus is a genus of mites in the Phytoseiidae family.

Species
 Paraseiulus deogyuensis (Ryu & Ehara, 1990)
 Paraseiulus erevanicus Wainstein & Arutunjan, 1967
 Paraseiulus inobservatus Kolodochka, 1983
 Paraseiulus insignis Kolodochka, 1983
 Paraseiulus intermixtus Kolodochka, 1983
 Paraseiulus jirofticus Daneshvar, 1987
 Paraseiulus minutus Athias-Henriot, 1978
 Paraseiulus porosus Kolodochka, 1980
 Paraseiulus soleiger (Ribaga, 1904)
 Paraseiulus talbii (Athias-Henriot, 1960)
 Paraseiulus triporus (Chant & Yoshida-Shaul, 1982)
 Paraseiulus yugoslavicus (Mijuskovic & Tomasevic, 1975)

References

Phytoseiidae